The Blue Hole of Santa Rosa, or simply the Blue Hole, is a circular, bell-shaped pool or small lake located along Route 66 east of Santa Rosa, New Mexico that is a tourist attraction and swimming venue, and one of the most popular dive destinations in the US for scuba diving and training. The Blue Hole is an artesian well and cenote that was once used as a fish hatchery.

Description
The water in the pool originates deep underground below  from the western edge of the Ogallala Aquifer. 

The Blue Hole is an example of a natural artesian well, a type of well or spring fed by water under high pressure, and of a cenote, a collapsed cavern exposing groundwater beneath. The cavern was formed by the dissolution of the limestone bedrock by groundwater, carving caverns into the rock until the roof caved in.

At the bottom are large boulders, rubble, bones, masks, a crucifix, and other objects, and the entrance to a labyrinth of cave passages and rooms. The source water for the pool rushes up from the rubble in the floor of this cavern. Beneath this may be more passages. One local legend states that the passages may be connected to Carlsbad Caverns, one of the longest explored cave systems in the United States; however, the surface entrance to that cave system is located over 200 miles to the south.

Since 1976, the cave passages have been sealed off to the public by a metal grate installed by the city to prevent access by inexperienced divers. It was only allowed to be unsealed for mapping between 2013 and 2016 by the ADM Exploration Foundation, an experienced cave exploration group. Hazards in the passages include frequent cave-ins, zero visibility due to silt, and extreme restrictions.

Fauna present in the Blue Hole includes goldfish, koi, carp, and crawdads.

At the site is a visitors center, divers' locker rooms, a conference center, picnic tables, restrooms, a diving platform, and a short wall surrounding the pool to prevent surface runoff from fouling the clarity of the water. The pool is open for public use, including picnic, swimming, diving, and snorkeling, however, there are no lifeguards on duty.

History

Early history
The Blue Hole was used by nomadic tribes as a reliable water source in the arid plains that surround the area. Cowboys on cattle drives across the Pecos River would also stop by the pool. When Route 66 came through the city in the 1920s, the original alignment brought it right past the property of the Blue Hole. The pool became a popular stop and tourist attraction for motorists on the new highway. In 1932, it became a hatchery for the National Fish Hatchery. Afterward it became the Blue Hole Recreation Area in the 1970s, then the Blue Hole Dive and Conference Center. In the current era of the Interstate, the pool continues to be a popular destination with both locals and divers from around the world.

Exploration

1976 Recovery operation
During their searches for a missing diver in late winter and early spring of 1976, rescue divers with the New Mexico State Police crudely mapped part of the then-unexplored cave system and noted the discoveries within. At the entrance, they encountered a tight restriction that required removing equipment to access, and the exhaust from their SCUBA equipment dislodged rocks and caused cave-ins.

When the divers accessed the second room, they noted formations such as shafts, cracks, and crevasses in the ceiling of the cavern. Another room they explored, dubbed the "Tee-Pee Room", had a ceiling that "looks as though thousands of ice cream cones were hanging invertly", as noted by Police diver Tom Hawkins. Hawkins also stated of the caves: 

After the recovery operation, the city of Santa Rosa sealed the entrance with a  diameter duct and grate "snorkel pipe" in April to prevent future access to the caverns. Moreover, the Army Corps of Engineers dumped two truckloads of rock and debris into the grate, apparently without the knowledge of city officials.

ADM expeditions
In 2013, the ADM Exploration Foundation and the city fielded an exploration expedition to explore and map the cave system. With permission from the city, the expedition team removed the snorkel pipe to gain access to the first cavern. However, the lack of previous knowledge of the debris dumped into the grate by the army prevented further exploration. Although the team were able to remove tons of rock and debris from the cavern floor significantly increasing the water discharge rate, they ultimately "were thwarted by one lone boulder choking the entrance to the second room". 

After the expedition, the city installed another grate to prevent access to the exposed cave entrance. Over the next three years, the team worked with state police and APD divers to dredge and remove the remaining debris and open up the passages. 

In March 2016 the ADM team returned for another expedition to map and explore the entirety of the cave system. Another fatality occurred during this expedition, outlined in the next section of this article. After the expedition, the team announced that all accessible areas of the system have been explored and mapped, and recommended to the city that the entrance remain closed to the public.

Once again, the city installed a snorkel pipe to prevent further access. As of March 2021, no one has entered the caves since the expedition.

Incidents
On March 10, 1976, a team of student divers from Oklahoma were training in the pool when two divers became separated from the group and failed to surface. State Police rescue divers began a search of the unexplored caves and on the first day, they found a body in the first chamber. Divers continued searching the passages for the next six weeks until the second body was found deep within the cave system. This incident prompted the city to seal the caves from the public.

On March 26, 2016, 43-year-old California diver Shane Thompson, a Navy veteran from the ADM Exploration Foundation with over 20 years of diving experience, including search and rescue and recovery operations, was exploring passageways when he became separated from his partner Mike Young after their tether broke. By the time Young had located Thompson, he had already drowned. Young returned the next day to recover the body.

See also 
 List of sinkholes of the United States
 Bottomless Lakes State Park, similar water bodies also in New Mexico

References

Bodies of water of Guadalupe County, New Mexico
Sinkholes of the United States
Tourist attractions in Guadalupe County, New Mexico
Underwater diving deaths
Underwater diving sites in the United States